Vaux-le-Pénil is a commune in the Seine-et-Marne department in the Île-de-France region in north-central France.

Demographics
Inhabitants of Vaux-le-Pénil are called Penivauxois.

Education
Public schools in the commune include :
 three preschools : Romain Rolland, Gaston Dumont and Jean-Robert Rouchon
 three elementary schools : Romain Rolland, Gaston Dumont and Beuve et Gantier
 one junior high school : La mare au Champs
 one high school/sixth form college : Simone Signoret

See also
Communes of the Seine-et-Marne department

References

External links

Official site 

Communes of Seine-et-Marne